Luc Berthold  (born 1965 or 1966) is a Canadian politician who was elected to represent the riding of Mégantic—L'Érable in the House of Commons in the 2015 election.

On February 6, 2022, Berthold was appointed Deputy Leader of the Conservative Party by interim leader Candice Bergen. Berthold was also named the party's Quebec lieutenant, replacing Alain Rayes.

Electoral record

References

External links

Living people
Conservative Party of Canada MPs
French Quebecers
Members of the House of Commons of Canada from Quebec
Mayors of Thetford Mines
Politicians from Sherbrooke
21st-century Canadian politicians
Year of birth missing (living people)
Deputy opposition leaders